Bogdan Vitalyevich Pishchalnikov ((born 26 August 1982) is a Russian discus thrower. He is the brother of Darya Pishchalnikova and Kirill Pishchalnikov.

He finished eleventh at the 2003 Universiade and seventh at the 2006 IAAF World Cup. He also competed at the 2005 World Championships and the 2006 European Athletics Championships without qualifying for the final round.

His personal best throw is 67.23 metres, achieved in May 2010 in Sochi.

References

 
 
 

1982 births
Living people
Russian male discus throwers
Olympic male discus throwers
Olympic athletes of Russia
Athletes (track and field) at the 2008 Summer Olympics
Athletes (track and field) at the 2012 Summer Olympics
Competitors at the 2003 Summer Universiade
World Athletics Championships athletes for Russia
Russian Athletics Championships winners